The Okeechobee Waterway or Okeechobee Canal is a relatively shallow artificial waterway in the United States, stretching across Florida from Fort Myers on the west coast to Stuart on Florida's east coast. The system of channels runs through Lake Okeechobee and consists of the Caloosahatchee River to the west of the lake and the St. Lucie Canal east of the lake.

Geologically and geographically, the north bank of the canal is the official southern limit of the Eastern Continental Divide.

History
It was built/finished in 1937 to provide a water route across Florida, allowing boats to pass east–west across the state rather than traveling the long route around the southern end of the state.

Management
Lake Okeechobee and the Okeechobee Waterway Project is part of the complex water-management system known as the Central and Southern Florida Flood Control Project. The projects cover  starting just south of Orlando and extending southward through the Kissimmee River Basin to the Everglades National Park to Florida Bay.

The U.S. Army Corps of Engineers manages five locks and dams along the Okeechobee Waterway.

Locks and dams

St. Lucie Lock and Dam
The St. Lucie lock was built in 1941 for navigation and flood-control purposes. In 1944, the connecting spillway structure was built for flood and regulatory flow control through the St. Lucie Canal to manage the water level in Lake Okeechobee.

Port Mayaca Lock and Dam
The Port Mayaca Lock and Dam was built in 1977 for navigation purposes, to permit the raising of water levels in Lake Okeechobee, and to moderate the effects of higher lake stages along the St. Lucie Canal.

Ortona Lock and Dam
The Ortona Lock and Dam were constructed in 1937 for navigation purposes.

In 1934, the locks were dredged by Captain James B. Cox, who worked on the Hoover Dike, with Robert Pierce as engineer.  The first lockmaster was Jack O'Day, then Captain Cox, afterward.

Moore Haven Lock and Dam
The Moore Haven Lock and Dam were constructed in 1935 for navigation and flood-control purposes.

W.P. Franklin Lock and Dam
The W.P. Franklin Lock and Dam were constructed in 1965 for flood control, water control, prevention of saltwater intrusion, and navigation purposes.

See also

 List of canals in the United States

References

External links 
Cruising the Okeechobee Waterway - BlueSeas
Okeechobee Waterway - U.S. Army Corps of Engineers Jacksonville District
Lake Okeechobee Watershed - Florida DEP

1937 establishments in Florida
Canals in Florida
Canals opened in 1937
Transportation buildings and structures in Glades County, Florida
Transportation buildings and structures in Hendry County, Florida
Transportation buildings and structures in Lee County, Florida
Transportation buildings and structures in Martin County, Florida
Transportation buildings and structures in Palm Beach County, Florida
Historic American Engineering Record in Florida
Indian River Lagoon
Lake Okeechobee
United States Army Corps of Engineers